The Irish Loyal and Patriotic Union (ILPU) was a unionist political organisation in Ireland, established to oppose the Irish Home Rule movement.

The Irish Loyal and Patriotic Union was formed in Dublin in May 1885 by a small number of southern businessmen, landowners and academics. It sought to unite Liberals and Conservatives in the three southern provinces of Ireland on a common platform of maintenance of the union between Great Britain and Ireland. In doing so, it undermined the Conservative Loyal Irish Union, which shut down as a result of the ILPU's founding. From its inception, the ILPU's main opponent was the Irish Parliamentary Party. The ILPU published pamphlets, leaflets and a news sheet, Notes from Ireland, which were distributed widely in Ireland. The organisation had some success in preventing rivalry between Liberals and Conservatives, and in a number of cases candidates came forward in the 1885 general election simply as ‘loyalists’. A total of 54 of the southern seats were contested by anti-home rule candidates.

The success of the organisation led its leaders to found the Irish Unionist Alliance in 1891, at which point the ILPU ceased to exist as a separate body.

1885 general election

Table shows results for candidates running under a purely "Loyalist" banner.

References

1885 establishments in Ireland
Defunct political parties in Ireland
Organisations associated with the Conservative Party (UK)
Political parties established in 1885
Political parties in pre-partition Ireland
Unionism in Ireland
1891 disestablishments in Ireland
Political parties disestablished in 1891